Frederick Charles Thomas Tomlinson (1886 – after 1910) was an English footballer who played for Barnsley and Stoke.

Career
Tomlinson was born in South Shields and played for South Shields Primitive Methodists, Workington United and West Stanley before joining Barnsley in 1907. He played 16 times for the "Tykes" in two seasons scoring once against Leicester Fosse but was released in May 1909. He joined Stoke for the 1909–10 season where he played 22 times scoring three goals.

Career statistics
Source:

References

1886 births
Year of death missing
English footballers
Association football wing halves
West Stanley F.C. players
Barnsley F.C. players
Stoke City F.C. players
English Football League players
Southern Football League players
Footballers from South Shields